Maria Sora  (born 10 June 1994) is a Greek female water polo player. She plays for Olympiacos in Greece. She was a part of the team winning the 2014–15 LEN Euro League Women, the 2015 Women's LEN Super Cup and the 2014 Women's LEN Trophy.

References

External links
 Maria Sora interview by waterpolonews.gr (in Greek)

1994 births
Living people
Olympiacos Women's Water Polo Team players
Greek female water polo players
Place of birth missing (living people)
Water polo players from Piraeus
21st-century Greek women